Idalou High School is a public high school located in the city of Idalou, USA and classified as a 3A school by the UIL.  It is a part of the Idalou Independent School District located in eastern Lubbock County.   In 2015, the school was rated "Met Standard" by the Texas Education Agency.

Athletics
The Idalou Wildcats compete in these sports - 

Cross Country, Football, Basketball, Golf, Tennis, Track, Baseball & Softball

State titles
Boys Basketball -  
2011(2A)
Football - 
2010(2A/D2)

State Finalist
Boys Basketball -  
2010(2A)

Notable alumni
Cline Paden (August 22, 1919 – May 26, 2007) Church of Christ evangelist and missionary.  Was a 1937 graduate of Idalou High School.

References

External links
 Idalou ISD website

Public high schools in Texas
Schools in Lubbock County, Texas